Alan Sandow (born 28 February 1952) is an Australian drummer and was a member of the rock band Sherbet.

Early life
Sandow was born in Adelaide and was later educated at Newington College in Sydney (1964-1968).

Music career
After the break-up of Sherbet, Sandow joined The Willie Winter Band with guitarist Ian "Willie" Winter and bass player Barry McCulloch.

Airline career
Sandow opted out of the professional music scene, and now works for a regional airline in New South Wales.

References

1952 births
Australian drummers
Male drummers
People educated at Newington College
Living people
Sherbet (band) members